Common Turkic, or Shaz Turkic, is a taxon in some classifications of the Turkic languages that includes all of them except the Oghuric languages.

Classification
Lars Johanson's proposal contains the following subgroups: 

 Southwestern Common Turkic (Oghuz)
Northwestern Common Turkic (Kipchak)
 Southeastern Common Turkic (Karluk)
 Northeastern Common Turkic (Siberian)
Arghu Common Turkic (Khalaj)

In that classification scheme, Common Turkic is opposed to Oghur Turkic (Lir-Turkic). The Common Turkic languages are characterized by sound correspondences such as Common Turkic š versus Oghuric l and Common Turkic z versus Oghuric r.

In other classification schemes (such as those of Alexander Samoylovich and Nikolay Baskakov), the breakdown is different.

References

Agglutinative languages
Turkic languages
Vowel-harmony languages